Acanthogonatus peniasco is a mygalomorph spider of Chile, its name arising from its type locality: El Peñasco, Linares, VII Region (del Maule), Chile. Females differ from those of A. franki and A. recinto in the shorter, wider, and more sclerotized spermathecal ducts, and from those of other species in the genus by having 1-1-1 P spines in the patella IV.

Description
Female: total length ; cephalothorax length ; cephalic region length , width ; fovea width ; medial ocular quadrangle , width ; labium length , width ; sternum length , width . Its cephalic region is moderately convex, with a deep fovea with a posterior notch. Its labium possesses 2 cuspules. A serrula is present. Its posterior sternal sigilla is oval and submarginal, with its sternum being rebordered. Chelicerae: rastellum is formed by long, thin setae. Its cephalothorax, legs and palpi are a reddish-brown colour, while its abdomen is a light yellowish brown, with dorsal mottles present.

Distribution
It is known to habitate in borrows only from the type locality. These have an open entrance, lined with little silk, in banks and hill slopes in an open forest.

It sometimes co-habitates the same area as Calathotarsus and Scotinoecus species.

References

External links

 ADW entry

Pycnothelidae
Spiders of South America
Spiders described in 1995
Endemic fauna of Chile